The Litoral Lagunar Microregion (Microrregião do Litoral Lagunar) is a microregion in the southern part of the state of Rio Grande do Sul, Brazil.  Its total area is 9,379.518 km².

Municipalities 
The microregion consists of the following municipalities:
Chuí 
Rio Grande
Santa Vitória do Palmar
São José do Norte

References

Microregions of Rio Grande do Sul